Solidago puberula, the downy goldenrod, is a plant species native to eastern North America from Nova Scotia and Ontario south to Florida and Louisiana. Two subspecies are commonly recognized:

Solidago puberula subsp. puberula
Solidago puberula subsp. pulverulenta

It can have 1-5 puberulent (hairy) stems. Leaves are toothed, tapering at the tip, puberulent on both sides. Flowering heads number 15–250, in an elongate, paniculiform array. Ray flowers are yellow, 9–16 per head.

References

puberula
Flora of Canada
Flora of the United States